Coen Vermeltfoort (born 11 April 1988) is a Dutch racing cyclist, who currently rides for UCI Continental team .

Major results

2007
 3rd Grand Prix de Waregem
 6th Overall Olympia's Tour
1st Stage 5
 10th Omloop van het Houtland
2008
 1st Ronde van Drenthe
 1st Paris–Roubaix Espoirs
 Tour de Bretagne
1st Stages 1 & 2
 1st Stage 5 Grand Prix Guillaume Tell
 1st Stage 3 Tour de l'Avenir
 4th Profronde van Fryslan
 5th ZLM Tour
 6th Overall Le Triptyque des Monts et Châteaux
 7th Overall Olympia's Tour
1st Stages 1 & 3
 10th Beverbeek Classic
2010
 1st Zellik–Galmaarden
 2nd Overall Olympia's Tour
1st Stages 4 & 6
 2nd Omloop der Kempen
 3rd Dwars door Drenthe
 6th Omloop van het Waasland
 8th Ronde van Drenthe
2013
 1st Arno Wallaard Memorial
 1st Grote 1-MeiPrijs
 1st Prologue Olympia's Tour
 1st Prologue (TTT) Volta a Portugal
 5th Zuid Oost Drenthe Classic II
 7th Ronde van Overijssel
 7th Omloop der Kempen
2014
 Flèche du Sud
1st  Points classification
1st Stages 1, 3 & 4
 1st Stage 4 Circuit des Ardennes
 2nd Ronde van Overijssel
 2nd Baronie Breda Classic
 3rd Omloop van het Houtland
 4th Overall Olympia's Tour
1st  Sprints classification
1st Prologue
 9th Grote Prijs Jef Scherens
2015
 2nd De Kustpijl
 3rd Omloop van het Houtland
 3rd Ronde van Overijssel
 7th Parel van de Veluwe
 8th Ster van Zwolle
 10th Ronde van Zeeland Seaports
2016
 Flèche du Sud
1st  Points classification
1st Stages 1 & 5
 2nd Ster van Zwolle
 3rd Dorpenomloop Rucphen
 4th Ronde van Limburg
 7th Overall Tour de Normandie
 9th Arnhem–Veenendaal Classic
2017
 2nd Nationale Sluitingsprijs
 4th Road race, National Road Championships
 5th Halle–Ingooigem
 5th Handzame Classic
 6th Nokere Koerse
 6th Trofeo Playa de Palma
 6th Tacx Pro Classic
 7th Grand Prix de Denain
 7th Primus Classic
 8th Trofeo Porreres-Felanitx-Ses Salines-Campos
 9th Ronde van Overijssel
2018
 2nd Elfstedenronde
 3rd Trofeo Palma
 6th Grand Prix de Denain
 10th Ronde van Limburg
2019
 1st Slag om Norg
 9th Arno Wallaard Memorial
 10th Road race, National Road Championships
2020
 3rd Ster van Zwolle
2021
 1st Ster van Zwolle
 2nd Omloop der Kempen 
 2nd Dorpenomloop Rucphen
 3rd Omloop van Valkenswaard 
 4th Ronde van Drenthe
 5th PWZ Zuidenveld Tour
 6th Overall Course de Solidarność et des Champions Olympiques
2022
 1st PWZ Zuidenveld Tour
 1st Ronde van Overijssel
 1st Grote Prijs Rik Van Looy
 1st Ronde van de Achterhoek
 1st 2 Districtenpijl-Ekeren-Deurne
 1st Stage 7 Tour de Normandie
 2nd Ronde van Limburg
 2nd Sluitingsprijs Putte-Kapellen 
 4th Overall Tour du Loir-et-Cher
1st Stage 4
 1st Stage 1a Course Cycliste de Solidarnosc et des Champions Olympiques 
 4th Visit Friesland Elfsteden Race
 4th Memorial Briek Schotte 
 4th Omloop der Kempen
 7th Memorial Rik Van Steenbergen
 7th Puivelde koerse 
2023
 1st Ster van Zwolle

References

External links

1988 births
Living people
Dutch male cyclists
People from Bernheze
UCI Road World Championships cyclists for the Netherlands
Cyclists from North Brabant